The bucktooth tetra (Exodon paradoxus) is the only member of the genus Exodon and is a freshwater fish of the characin family (family Characidae) of order Characiformes.  It is native to the Amazon Basin and Guyana. Though first described in 1845, it was not imported and distributed by the aquarium trade until 1932.

This species has a typical elongated tetra appearance; it is light tan in colour with two distinct black spots (one before the tail and another below the dorsal fin). The dorsal fin is bright red. The appellation “bucktooth” does not describe the fish’s appearance, since Bucktooth tetras show no signs of having teeth. It grows to a maximum overall length of approximately 12 cm (4.7 in).

The fish's natural diet consist of small invertebrates, other fish, and plants. It is not a safe tank mate for fellow tetras, because it will eat small fish, nor is it a safe tank mate for larger species, because it is a notorious lepidophage.  Bucktooth tetra are best kept alone or in large planted tanks that provide adequate protective coverage for other species. They are best kept in shoals of eight or more; a shoal of fewer than eight will pick at each other and stress the exodons to a point where it will either catch a  disease or die of severe wounds. It is otherwise extremely hardy and can live in home aquaria for more than ten years.

See also
List of freshwater aquarium fish species

References

Innes, W. T. Exotic Aquarium Fishes, 19th ed. Innes Publishing Co. Philadelphia. 1956.

Tetras

Fish described in 1844